Ronald G. Johnson (September 21, 1943 – July 14, 2020) was an American pharmacist and politician. 

Johnson was born in Bonifay, Florida. Johnson received his degrees in chemistry and biology from Florida State University and in pharmacy from Auburn University. He lived in Sylacauga, Alabama and was a pharmacist. He was a member of the Alabama House of Representatives from the 33rd District, serving since 1978, which made him the chamber's most senior member. Johnson was a member of the Democratic Party until 1998, when he switched to the Republican Party. He died of liver cancer on July 14, 2020, while still in office.

References

1943 births
2020 deaths
Democratic Party members of the Alabama House of Representatives
Republican Party members of the Alabama House of Representatives
People from Bonifay, Florida
People from Sylacauga, Alabama
Florida State University alumni
Pharmacists from Alabama
21st-century American politicians
Deaths from cancer in Alabama
20th-century American politicians
Deaths from liver cancer